Alais or Allais is the first carbonaceous chondrite meteorite identified. The meteorite contains a number of elements in similar proportions to the solar system in its primordial state. It also contains organic compounds and water. It has proved to be one of the most important meteorites discovered in France.

History
At 17:00 on 15 March 1806, two detonations were heard near Alès in Gard, France. Shortly afterwards, two soft black stones were discovered in the villages of Saint-Étienne-de-l'Olm and Castelnau-Valence, weighing  and  respectively. The fragments were collected by people who observed the impact and given to two scientists that lived locally. The meteorite was analysed by Louis Jacques Thénard, who published a study in 1807, showing that it had a high carbon content. It was initially doubted that the fragments were of non-terrestrial origins as their attributes were markedly different to existing meteorites. However, it was increasingly realised that this was a new, albeit rare, type of meteorite. The meteorite is also known as Valence.

Curation and Distribution
As an early fall (soon after the consensus that meteorites were real, extraterrestrial phenomenon), Alais has largely been dispersed. Few samples have been preserved, less than Orgueil, but more than Tonk and particularly Revelstoke.

Source: Grady, M. M. Catalogue of Meteorites, 5th Edition, Cambridge University Press

Description

Overview
The Alais meteorite is one of the most important meteorites in France. A fragment, weighing  is held by the National Museum of Natural History, France.

Composition and classification
The meteorite is one of five known meteorites belonging to the CI chondrite group. This group is remarkable for having an elemental distribution that has the strongest similarity to that of the solar nebula. Except for certain volatile elements, like carbon, hydrogen, oxygen, nitrogen and the noble gases, which are not present in the meteorites in the same proportions, the ratios of the elements are very similar. The meteorite contains cubanite, dolomite, fosterite, pyrrhotite and zircon amongst other minerals.

Origin of life controversy
The meteorite has been at the centre of controversial claims about an extraterrestrial origin of life since the discovery of organic matter on the meteorite by Jöns Jacob Berzelius. Organic compounds, amino acids and water have been found in the meteorite. However, studies differentiate between organic and biological matter, the latter not being present.

See also
 Glossary of meteoritics

References

Citations

Bibliography
 
 
 
 
 
 
 
 
 

Astrobiology
Meteorites found in France
1806 in France